Anthony "Tony" Alexander Dean,   (born August 19, 1953) is a Canadian senator and former Ontario civil servant. He was secretary of the Cabinet, head of the Ontario Public Service, and the clerk of the Executive Council from 2002 to 2008.

Dean received a Bachelor of Arts degree in sociology and social anthropology from University of Hull and a Master of Arts degree in sociology from McMaster University. He worked for ten years in the public sector in collective bargaining before joining the Ontario Public Service in 1989. He was Deputy Minister of Labour and Deputy Minister and Associate Secretary of Cabinet, Policy. In 2002, he was appointed by Ontario Premier Ernie Eves Secretary of the Cabinet and Clerk of the Executive Council. He retired in 2008 and became a professor at the University of Toronto’s School of Public Policy and Governance. He held this role until he was appointed to the Senate of Canada, at which point he became a Distinguished Fellow. In 2010 Dean was a senior research fellow at the Harvard Kennedy School.  He advises governments, domestically and internationally, on public administration, public policy and implementation.

Ontario Premier Dalton McGuinty described him as "the ultimate public servant, exhibiting on a daily basis the drive to get things done, and the diplomacy required to have them done well".

In 2009, he was made a member of the Order of Ontario in recognition for having "transformed the Ontario Public Service".

On October 31, 2016, Dean's appointment to the Senate of Canada was announced. Dean sits as an independent.

References

External links
 

1953 births
Living people
Alumni of the University of Hull
McMaster University alumni
Members of the Order of Ontario
Ontario civil servants
Canadian senators from Ontario
Independent Canadian senators
21st-century Canadian politicians
Independent Senators Group